Runnin' Out of Fools  is the sixth studio album by American singer Aretha Franklin, released in 1964 by Columbia Records. It was arranged and conducted by Belford Hendricks. The front cover photograph was taken by Henry Parker.

Track listing
Side One
"Mockingbird" (Charlie Foxx, Inez Foxx)
"How Glad I Am" (Jimmy Williams, Larry Harrison)
"Walk On By" (Hal David, Burt Bacharach)
"Every Little Bit Hurts" (Ed Cobb)
"The Shoop Shoop Song (It's in His Kiss)" (Rudy Clark)
"You'll Lose a Good Thing" (Barbara Lynn Ozen)
Side Two
"I Can't Wait Until I See My Baby's Face" (Chip Taylor, Norman Meade)
"It's Just a Matter of Time" (Belford Hendricks, Clyde Otis, Brook Benton)
"Runnin' Out of Fools" (Kay Rogers, Richard Ahlert)
"My Guy" (Smokey Robinson)
"Two Sides of Love" (Roy Alfred)
"One Room Paradise" (John Leslie McFarland)

References

Aretha Franklin albums
1964 albums
Albums arranged by Belford Hendricks
Columbia Records albums